The 1968 Appalachian State Mountaineers football team was an American football team that represented Appalachian State University as an independent during the 1968 NAIA football season. In their fourth year under head coach Carl Messere, the Mountaineers compiled an overall record of 8–2.

Schedule

References

Appalachian State
Appalachian State Mountaineers football seasons
Appalachian State Mountaineers football